Eyralpenus scioana is a moth of the family Erebidae. It was described by Charles Oberthür in 1880. It is found in Angola, Cameroon, the Democratic Republic of the Congo, Ethiopia, Kenya, Malawi, Mozambique, Namibia, Tanzania, Uganda, Zambia and Zimbabwe.

The larvae feed on Ipomoea species.

Subspecies
 Eyralpenus scioana scioana
 Eyralpenus scioana intensa (Rothschild, 1910)
 Eyralpenus scioana paucipunctata (Kiriakoff, 1963)

References

Spilosomina
Moths described in 1880
Moths of Sub-Saharan Africa